Dingo is a rural town and locality in the Central Highlands Region, Queensland, Australia.

Geography
The Fitzroy Developmental Road runs north-west from the Capricorn Highway.

The Central Western railway line passes through the locality with two stations (from west to east):

 Umolo railway station
Dingo railway station, serving the town

History
The town was surveyed in 1889 and took its name from the nearby Dingo Creek. For a time in 1940 the town was known as Remo. Dingo Post Office opened on 1 October 1876.

Dingo Provisional School opened on 29 May 1876. On 22 January 1877 it became Dingo State School.

In 1973, a population of Bridled nail-tail wallabies (Onychogalea fraenata) was found in the Dingo area by a fencing contractor. Not having been seen since 1937, the species had been considered extinct. The area where the wallabies was rediscovered was protected as Taunton National Park.

On 31 January 1997, Duaringa Shire mayor Tom Hall unveiled a bronze sculpture of a dingo in Normanby Street opposite the library. It was created by Gaye Porter.  A plaque attached below the statue explains how pioneer Moses Wafer named the area after hearing dingos howling during the night while camped near the present-day site of the town.

Education 
Dingo State School is a government primary (Early Childhood-6) school for boys and girls on the corner of Kennedy and Normanby Streets. In 2018, the school had an enrolment of 47 students with 5 teachers (4 full-time equivalent) and 6 non-teaching staff (4 full-time equivalent).

Amenities 
The Central Highlands Regional Council operates a public library at 10 Normanby Street.

Events 
In August each year, the Dingo Race Club holds the annual Dingo Race Day and World Dingo Trap Throwing Competition at Bauman Park.  The event was attended by 2000 people in 2019 when it celebrated its 30th anniversary.  This figure grew to 4,000 when the event returned in 2021 after being cancelled in 2020 due to the COVID-19 pandemic.

Notable residents
Australian rugby league player Ben Hunt grew up in Dingo.

References

External links 
Dingo, Queensland - Central Highlands website
 

Towns in Queensland
Central Highlands Region
Localities in Queensland